Ay María qué puntería! is a Mexican sitcom, from Televisa. It centers on the adventures of an indigenous Mexican woman named La India María, who works as a maid in Mexico City.

Synopsis 
When indigenous orange seller María Nicolasa Cruz is chased by a government inspector she crosses paths with an aspiring television producer and his crew. She is offered a maiden job and is soon involved in many of their projects, which results in various comedic adventures and great outcomes for all of them.

Cast 
 María Elena Velasco as María Nicolasa Cruz
 Carlos Gastelum as Estéban Spilman
 Rubén Cerda as Roque
 Ernesto Pape as Michel Lavalle
 Adrían Ramos as Sócrates Casiomero
 Adriana del Río as Ana María Chamorro Bueno, "Anilú"
 Aideé Gracia as Doña Macarena
 Alejandro Márquez as Chilango

References

External links

Mexican television sitcoms